Events in the year 1993 in the Netherlands.

Incumbents
 Monarch: Beatrix
 Prime Minister: Ruud Lubbers

Events
29 May – The Hague Adoption Convention is drafted.
22 July to 2 August – The 1993 World Games were held in The Hague.

Births
 

12 January – Jeroen Meijers, cyclist.
18 January – Benito van de Pas, darts player
31 January – Angela Malestein, handball player.
27 February – Lucas Jussen, pianist
5 March – Bregje Heinen, model
14 March – Denza, music producer
6 May – Wesley Vissers, bodybuilder
7 May – Stefano Denswil, footballer
15 May – Olaf Schaftenaar, basketball player
19 May – Tess Wester, handball player.
29 May – Wessel Keemink, volleyball player
8 June – Enzo Knol, video blogger
15 June – Elisa Piek, badminton player
1 July – Joey Dale, DJ, record producer and musician
1 July – Anne Haast, chess player.
5 July – Brian Kamstra, cyclist.
20 July – Adam Maher, footballer
1 August – Sam Feldt, DJ, record producer and entrepreneur 
29 October – Lijpe, rapper
4 December – Taco van der Hoorn, cyclist.

Deaths

8 January – Theo Bruins, pianist and composer (b. 1929)
26 January – Jan Gies, member of the Dutch resistance (b. 1905)
2 February – Pierre Schunck, member of the Dutch resistance (b. 1906).
3 February – Greetje Donker, dancer (b. 1906)
8 February – Bram van der Stok, World War II fighter pilot and flying ace (b. 1915)
23 April – Bertus Aafjes, poet (b. 1914)
25 May – Flip Regout, rower (b. 1915).
26 June – Willy van Hemert, actor and theatre and television director, and songwriter (b. 1912)
18 July – Jan van Druten, painter, sculptor and ceramist (b. 1916)
5 September – René Klijn, singer and model (b. 1962)
22 October – Elie Aron Cohen, physician (b. 1909)

Full date missing
Arie Andries Kruithof, physicist (b. 1909)
Sybren van Tuinen, politician and public servant (b. 1913)

References

 
1990s in the Netherlands
Years of the 20th century in the Netherlands
Netherlands
Netherlands